Nizhneyanaktayevo (Tübänge Yanaqtay) is a rural locality (a village) in Verkhneyanaktayevsky Selsoviet, Baltachevsky District, Bashkortostan, Russia. The population was 89 as of 2010. There are 4 streets.

Geography 
Nizhneyanaktayevo is located 7 km south of Starobaltachevo (the district's administrative centre) by road. Verkhneyanaktayevo is the nearest rural locality.

References 

Rural localities in Baltachevsky District